Hilger may refer to the following articles

Places
 Hilger, Montana, an unincorporated community in Fergus County, Montana, United States
 Hilger, Texas an unincorporated community in Fannin County, Texas

People with last name Hilger
Ernst Hilger (born 1950), Austrian art dealer 
Joseph Hilger (1903–1990), Luxembourgian sprinter and long jumper
Sister Marie Inez Hilger (1891–1977), Benedictine nun and anthropologist 
Mary Irma Hilger (1917–2003), American nun and nurse
Matthew Hilger, American professional poker player and author 
Rusty Hilger (1962–2019), American football player
Susanne Hilger (born 1958), German swimmer
Vera Hilger (born 1971), German painter